The Kalinin Nuclear Power Station ( []) is located about  north west of Moscow, in Tver Oblast near the town of Udomlya. Owner and operator of the plant is the state enterprise Rosenergoatom. Kalinin Nuclear Power Station supplies the majority of electricity in the Tver region and additionally serves Moscow, Saint Petersburg, and Vladimir. In 2005 the nuclear power station fed  into the grid. They were manufactured in 96 concrete sections each.

By March 2009 the containment structure of the new Kalinin Unit 4 reactor was nearly complete. The reactor achieved its first criticality on 8 November 2011.

Reactor data 

The Kalinin Nuclear Power Plant has four units:

See also

Nuclear power in Russia
Russian nuclear plant map

References

External links

The Kalinin NPP

Nuclear power stations built in the Soviet Union
Nuclear power stations in Russia
Buildings and structures in Tver Oblast
Nuclear power stations using VVER reactors